Ludwig Blum (24 July 1891 – 28 July 1974) was a Moravian-born Israeli painter. He emigrated to Israel in 1923, as part of the Third Aliyah, and became known as "the painter of Jerusalem".

Early life

Ludwig Blum was born in 1891 in Líšeň (now part of Brno), Margraviate of Moravia. He emigrated to Mandatory Palestine in 1923, as part of the Third Aliyah. He served in the First World War. He was privately educated in Vienna and later attended the Academy of Fine Arts in Prague.

Career

Upon his arrival in Mandatory Palestine, and as a dedicated Zionist, Blum started paintings scenes of everyday life and landscapes in Israel. He did many paintings of Jerusalem (including the Western Wall and the Mount of Olives), Tel Aviv, the Sea of Galilee and the Judaean Mountains. Additionally, he painted some kibbutzes: Kiryat Anavim and Degania Alef, and the lives of Israeli soldiers, including the Palmach. He also painted copper mines in the Timna Valley. He also painted the Arch of Constantine in Rome, Italy, and a vase of roses.

Blum became known as "the painter of Jerusalem". In 1933, his painting entitled simply Jerusalem was honoured at the Royal Academy of Arts in London. In 1967, he received the Yakir Yerushalayim from the City of Jerusalem.

In 2011 the Museum of Biblical Art in Manhattan held an exhibition of Blum's paintings.

Death
Blum died in 1975 in Jerusalem.

Selected paintings

Jerusalem in the Snow (1927).
Jerusalem, Temple Mount (1928).
Vase of Rose (1931).
Kibbutz Kiryat Anavim (1932).
Kibbutz Degania (1934).
The Judea mountains (1943).
The Arch of Constantine (1944).
Jerusalem, seen from Mount Scopus (1950).
The Market in Jerusalem (1950).
View of Jerusalem from the Hill of Evil Counsel (1951).
Landscape (1956).
Timna, Copper Mines (1957).
View of Jerusalem (1962).
Jerusalem, David's Tower and the Sultan's Pool, seen from Mishkanot Shaananim (1964).
The Western Wall.
The walled city of Jerusalem from the Mount of Olives.
Sea of Galilee.
Portrait with a keffiyeh.

See also
 List of Orientalist artists
 Orientalism

Further reading
The Real and the Ideal: The Painting of Ludwig Blum (Tel Aviv: Museum of the Jewish People, 2009).
The Land of Light and Promise, 50 Years Painting Jerusalem and Beyond: Ludwig Blum 1891-1974 (
Ben Uri Gallery and Museum, 2011).

References

1891 births
1974 deaths
Artists from Brno
People from the Margraviate of Moravia
Moravian Jews
Czechoslovak emigrants to Mandatory Palestine
20th-century Israeli painters
Orientalist painters
Israeli landscape painters
Painters of the Holy Land pre-1948
Zionists
Academy of Fine Arts, Prague alumni
Austro-Hungarian military personnel of World War I
Jewish painters
Burials at Har HaMenuchot
Academy of Fine Arts Vienna alumni